Collage (Chinese: 珂拉琪; pinyin: Kē Lā Qí; Japanese: コラジ) is a Taiwanese band that released their first album in 2021, with two members: lead singer Natsuko Lariyod, who is of mixed Hakka and Amis ancestry, and Hunter Wang, who is of Minnan descent. Rather than use Taiwanese Mandarin, the band focuses on producing music using Taiwanese, Japanese, Amis and English. They incorporate indigenous people's music into their compositions.

Members

Natsuko Lariyod 
Natsuko is a musician of mixed Hakka and Amis ancestry. She has a brother who is two years older than her. She attended Taoyuan Municipal Wu-Ling Senior High School in Taoyuan, Taiwan, and later studied at the National Taipei University's Department of Art and Design, where she wrote her thesis on Taiwanese indigenous culture. 

Natsuko's family was initially worried about her grades in high school, but they became supportive of her musical career after the success of the band. In addition to her musical talents, Natsuko also creates her own illustrations for the band's album covers.

Hunter Wang 
Hunter is a Taiwanese musician who first studied at the National Taiwan Normal University's Department of Civic Education and Leadership, before switching to the National Chengchi University's Department of Business Administration. He spent a total of seven years at university before deciding to focus on his musical career. Hunter has a brother who is two years older than him and has played a role in his musical career, introducing him to the singer Jay Chou and playing the guitar. 

He was in a car accident which led him to change his perspective on life. At about the same time, his relationship with his parents grew more distant, in part due to their different opinions on Taiwanese politics. 

Hunter formed a band with friends from high school during his university years and later joined another band called Human Remake (人造人類), which was later disbanded, which is also why he could only participate in non-live competitions, such as Tiānxià Dì Yī Shǎnlíng Gǎizào Dàhuì (天下第一閃靈改造大會).

Career 
The two members first collaborated in 2018 and with a song that won the "19+" category of a music competition for covering music of the Taiwanese band Chthonic (band) called Tiānxià Dì Yī Shǎnlíng Gǎizào Dàhuì (天下第一閃靈改造大會).

In 2019, they officially established the band under the name Collage, referring to the collage of the different styles of music and languages that come together in their songs. They started releasing their songs on YouTube and the Taiwanese music streaming website StreetVoice.

In 2022, the band won the award for best new artist in the 33rd Golden Melody Awards.

Discography

Album

Singles

Awards and accolades

References 

Taiwanese musical duos

Year of birth missing (living people)
Living people